On May 13, 2019, an African American woman, Pamela Turner, was shot and killed by a police officer from Baytown, Texas. 

The incident occurred at a parking lot of an apartment complex where both Turner and Officer Juan Delacruz (of the Baytown Police Department), were living at the time during an attempt to arrest her for outstanding warrants.

Video footage of the shooting was captured by a bystander and also by the officer's bodycam. Police stated the officer was attempting to arrest her for outstanding warrants when she used his Taser on him; at trial, Texas Ranger Lt. Eric Lopez testified more specifically that she used it on Delacruz’s genitals in the course of resisting arrest. The bodycam showed the struggle between the two prior to the shooting.

Turner's family said that the woman had suffered from schizophrenia and that Delacruz was aware of it; a neighbor also said that Turner was mentally unstable, that Delacruz was aware of it, and that he "had arrested her many times" and had used his Taser on her on the most recent occasion.

During the encounter, Turner said to the officer “You’re actually harassing me” and “I’m actually walking to my house”. Just prior to the shooting, she said “I’m pregnant.” The police department confirmed that Turner was not pregnant.

On September 14, 2020, a grand jury indicted Delacruz with aggravated assault by a public servant. On October 11, 2022, the jury found Delacruz not guilty.

The family has retained national civil rights attorneys Benjamin Crump and Devon Jacob.

References 

2020 controversies in the United States
2020 in Texas
African-American history of Texas
African-American-related controversies
Baytown, Texas
History of African-American civil rights
Law enforcement in Alabama
Mass media-related controversies in the United States
May 2020 events in the United States
Race and crime in the United States
Trials in the United States
African Americans shot dead by law enforcement officers in the United States